Nalin Malik (born 1910, date of death unknown) was an Indian swimmer. He competed in two events at the 1932 Summer Olympics.

References

1910 births
Year of death missing
Indian male swimmers
Olympic swimmers of India
Swimmers at the 1932 Summer Olympics
Sportspeople from Kolkata
Swimmers from West Bengal
20th-century Indian people